Rio Verde, Río Verde, or Rioverde (green river) may refer to:

Municipalities

Brazil
 Rio Verde, Goiás
 Lucas do Rio Verde
 Conceição do Rio Verde
 Rio Verde de Mato Grosso

Ecuador
 Río Verde Canton
 Rioverde, Ecuador

Other places
 Río Verde Quila Quila Canton, Chayanta Municipality, Bolivia
 Río Verde, Chile
 Rioverde, San Luis Potosí, Mexico
 Rio Verde, Arizona, United States

Rivers

Brazil
 Rio Verde (Bahia)
 Rio Verde (Das Almas River tributary)
 Rio Verde (Das Bois River)
 Rio Verde (Grande River tributary)
 Rio Verde (Guaporé River tributary, Mato Grosso)
 Rio Verde (Guaporé River tributary, Rondônia)
 Rio Verde (Jamari River tributary)
 Rio Verde (lower Paranaíba River tributary)
 Rio Verde (Maranhão River tributary)
 Rio Verde (Mato Grosso do Sul)
 Rio Verde (Piquiri)
 Rio Verde (Sacre River tributary)
 Rio Verde (São Paulo)
 Rio Verde (Sapucaí)
 Rio Verde (Teles Pires tributary)
 Rio Verde (Tocantins)
 Rio Verde (upper Paranaíba River tributary)
 Rio Verde Grande
 Rio Verde Pequeno

Mexico
 Río Verde (Chihuahua)
 Río Verde (Jalisco)
 Río Verde (Oaxaca)
 Río Verde (San Luis Potosi)

Paraguay
 Río Verde (Paraguay)

Spain
 Río Verde (Málaga), a river in Málaga Province, Andalusia, whose source is in the Sierra de las Nieves

United States
 Verde River

Other meanings
 Rio Verde Esporte Clube, a Brazilian football (soccer) club